The Ambatovy mine is large nickel and cobalt mine located in Madagascar, off the east coast of Africa. It is currently active, and the largest mine in the country.

Ownership and operations

Several exploration permits for the site were acquired by Phelps Dodge in 1995. In 2004 and 2005 Phelps Dodge sold its interest in the project to Dynatec Mining Limited. The mine was set up in 2007 by Dynatec Mining Limited, a Canadian company, backed by international development groups including the European Investment Bank. Sherritt International acquired Dynatec and later handed over majority control of the mine to the Japanese Sumitomo Corporation. The rest of equity in the mine is held by a South Korean consortium lead by the state-owned Korea Mine Rehabilitation and Mineral Resources Corporation (KOMIR), as well as STX Corporation and POSCO.

Until 2020, when it halted production due to the COVID-19 pandemic in Madagascar, the mine was producing 5,600 tonnes of refined cobalt and almost 60,000 tonnes of refined nickel every year. Operations resumed in March of 2021. After running at a loss from 2014 to 2020, the mine became profitable in 2021, especially after a large increase in nickel prices due to the Russian invasion of Ukraine.

Social and environmental impacts

Ambatovy is the largest investment in Madagascar’s history. The mine employs 10,000 people, of which 8,000 are Malagasy, and provides 27 per cent of the country's tax revenues.

The mine has been criticised for its local environmental impacts. The open pit mine displaced 1,600 hectares (3,950 acres) of rainforest and is connected by a 200 km long slurry pipeline to the processing plant at Toamasina, which has a 750-hectare (1,850-acre) area of lakes where waste materials are dumped. Effluent is also released into the sea, leading to complaints from fishermen. On the other hand, the mine is among the first to fully offset the loss of forest from mining operations.

References 

Nickel mines in Madagascar
2007 establishments in Madagascar